The Gallipolli Star is a military decoration awarded by the Ottoman Empire. It was known as the Ottoman War Medal or the Iron Crescent (from German Eiserner Halbmond, in allusion to the Iron Cross). It was instituted by Sultan Mehmed V on 1 March 1915 for gallantry in battle. This decoration was awarded for the duration of World War I to Ottoman and other Central Powers troops, primarily in Ottoman areas of engagement.

Design and composition

The award includes a badge, ribbon and campaign bar.

The medal, made of nickel-plated brass, has a vaulted star-shaped badge, 56 mm across the diagonal span of the arms. The tips of the star are capped by ball finials and enclosed in a raised silver edge with the field in red lacquer or enamel. A raised crescent, open at the top, encircles the center of the badge. Inside the crescent is the Tughra or cipher of the decoration's creator, Sultan Mehmed V Reşâd, over the date 1333 AH (AD 1915). The reverse is flat, unadorned and has a straight pin.

Along with the badge came a ribbon with red and white stripes. The dimensions of the ribbon for combatants are: red 2.5 mm; white, 5 mm.; red, 29 mm.; white, 5 mm.; red 2.5 mm. For non-combatant awardees, the colors are reversed.

The campaign bar is a right-pointing parabola of white at 56mm in length and 7mm in height. In the field is red Arabic script denoting the specific campaign:
 Chanakkale/Chanak (Gallipoli)
 Gaza
 Kanal
 Kut-al-Amara
 Sanatorium

Wear

When in formal dress, the badge was worn at the center, below the right breast pocket. Wear of the badge was exclusive; in everyday wear was substituted by the ribbon. The ribbon was worn from the second hole in the tunic button.

For Austrian and German awardees (usually members of the Asienkorps), the award took lower precedence to their own Iron Cross 2nd class, and the ribbon of the Iron Crescent was placed beneath that of the Iron Cross.

The ribbon could also be fashioned into a chest riband for placement on a ribbon bar when in undress.

The campaign bar was usually not worn.

Gallery

References

Klietmann, Dr. Kurt-Gerhard, (1971): Deutsche Auszeichnungen: Ein Geschichte der Ehrenzeichen und Medaillen, Erinnerungs- und Verdienstabzeichen des Deutschen Reiches, der deutschen Staaten sowie staatlicher Dienststellen, Organisationen, Verbande usw. Vom 18. - 20. Jahrhundert. 2 Band. Deutsches Reich 1871- 1945. Berlin: Ordenssammlung.
ERMAN, M.Demir, (2012) Harp Madalyası - The Turkish War Medal -  - http://demirerman.wix.com/turkish-war-medal

Military awards and decorations of the Ottoman Empire
Military awards and decorations of World War I
Awards established in 1915